Tatjana Paller  (born 7 September 1995 in Starnberg) is a German female track cyclist, representing Germany at international competitions. She competed at the 2016 UEC European Track Championships in the team pursuit.

Career results
2016
3rd  Points Race, UEC U23 European Track Championships
2017
1st  Points Race, UEC U23 European Track Championships

References

1995 births
Living people
German female cyclists
German track cyclists
Place of birth missing (living people)
People from Starnberg
Sportspeople from Upper Bavaria
Cyclists from Bavaria
20th-century German women
21st-century German women